Senator Herbert may refer to:

Caleb Claiborne Herbert (1814–1867), Texas State Senate
Frank Herbert (politician) (1931–2018), New Jersey State Senate
Paul M. Herbert (1889–1983), Ohio State Senate

See also
Felix Hebert (1874–1969), U.S. Senator from Rhode Island
Troy Hebert (born 1966), Louisiana State Senate